The following ships of the Royal Danish Navy have borne the name HDMS Bellona:

 , a frigate in service 1835–1862
  a submarine launched in 1919 and decommissioned in 1946
  a  launched in 1955 and decommissioned in 1981

References

Royal Danish Navy ship names